Robert H. Hodges Jr. (born 1944) is a senior judge of the United States Court of Federal Claims. He joined the court in 1990 after being nominated by President George H. W. Bush. His term ended in 2005 and he assumed senior status.

Early life, education, and career 
Robert H. Hodges Jr. was born in Columbia, South Carolina in 1944 and earned a Bachelor of Science from the University of South Carolina in 1966, conducting coursework at Wofford College prior to his time at the University. He went on to earn a Juris Doctor from University of South Carolina Law School in 1969.

Hodges was an Air National Guard airman first class from 1963–1969. He also was a Legislative aide for U.S. Senator Storm Thurmond from 1969–1971, and a Legislative assistant for U.S. Representative Floyd Spence from 1971–1977. Thereafter, he was Vice president of the First National Bank of South Carolina from 1977–1985, and Executive Vice president and general counsel of the South Carolina Bankers Association from 1985–1986. He continued his career in a private practice from 1986–1990.

Federal judicial service
Robert was nominated by President George H. W. Bush on January 25, 1990, to a seat vacated by John Light Napier. Hodges was confirmed by the United States Senate on March 9, 1990, and received his commission on March 12, 1990. He assumed senior status on March 11, 2005.

References

External links 

Living people
1944 births
Lawyers from Columbia, South Carolina
Judges of the United States Court of Federal Claims
United States Article I federal judges appointed by George H. W. Bush
20th-century American judges
University of South Carolina School of Law alumni
Wofford College alumni